Metropolis is a city located along the Ohio River in Massac County, Illinois, United States. As of the 2020 census, it had a population of 5,969, down from 6,537 in 2010. Metropolis is the county seat of Massac County and is part of the Paducah, KY-IL Micropolitan Statistical Area in Southern Illinois.

History
Located on the Ohio River, the Metropolis area has been settled by many different peoples throughout history. For thousands of years, varying cultures of Native Americans populated the area. The most complex society was the Mississippian culture, which reached its peak around AD 1100 and built a large city at Cahokia, near the Mississippi River and present-day Collinsville, Illinois, to the north opposite St. Louis, Missouri. Its people built large earthworks and related structures, many of which have been preserved and protected at the UNESCO World Heritage Site. Mississippian culture regional centers arose throughout the Ohio and lower Mississippian valleys, where the rivers were part of widespread trading routes used for exchange with other cultures.

In 1757, Massac County was settled by a French expedition, which built Fort de L'Ascension for use during the French and Indian War against the British (the war is also known as the Seven Years' War, which took place largely in Europe). The garrison at the fort was able to resist a Cherokee attack during the war. Afterward the defeated French abandoned the fort, and many moved west of the Mississippi River to escape British rule. When the victorious British colonists arrived to take control of territory ceded by the French, the Chickasaw had already destroyed the fort.

During the American Revolutionary War, the mostly ethnic French residents of the town were sympathetic to the rebels. Afterward in 1794, President George Washington ordered Fort Massac reconstructed, at a strategic site high above the Ohio River. The fort was severely damaged by the 1811–12 New Madrid earthquakes. Rather than rebuild, the US military abandoned the facility in 1814, as its forces were needed further west. Local settlers scavenged the timbers and left little behind of the original construction materials.

This section of the state was largely settled by migrants from the Upper South, and many brought slaves with them. It was years after Illinois was admitted as a free state that all such slaves gained their freedom.

The city of Metropolis was founded in 1839 near the site of Fort Massac by a merchant from Pittsburgh and a local land owner; the two envisioned that the location on the Ohio River would become a transport hub and chose a befittingly grand name. In 1843, the Illinois Legislature formed Massac County. The McCartney family became leaders in building the town of Metropolis.

During the early years of the American Civil War, soldiers were encamped in the vicinity. Although Illinois was established as a free state, this section had many southern sympathizers. Despite this background, the state stayed with the Union during the war.

During the twentieth century, agriculture has continued to be the economic driver of the region. The state's authorization of riverboat gambling led to Metropolis's becoming the site of the Harrah's Metropolis casino/hotel, a riverboat casino frequented by visitors from around the region. Tourism is one of the city's largest industries.

Metropolis is also the site of the Honeywell Uranium Hexafluoride Processing Facility, which converts milled uranium into uranium hexafluoride for nuclear reactors.

Proposal for a 'Western District of Columbia'

Prior to the American Civil War, some groups worked to establish a Western District of Columbia, to include present-day Metropolis and the nearby area of Kentucky. An 1850 map illustrates this proposal.

Geography
Metropolis is located in southern Massac County at  (37.153332, -88.725374), on the north shore of the Ohio River. It is bordered to the south, across the river, by McCracken County, Kentucky.

Demographics

As of the census of 2000, there were 6,482 people, 2,896 households, and 1,708 families residing in the city. The racial makeup of the city was 90.53% White, 7.61% African American, 0.20% Native American, 0.20% Asian, 0.45% from other races, and 1.02% from two or more races. Hispanic or Latino of any race were 0.74% of the population.

There were 2,896 households, out of which 24.4% had children under the age of 18 living with them, 43.6% were married couples living together, 11.9% had a female householder with no husband present, and 41.0% were non-families. 36.9% of all households were made up of individuals, and 20.0% had someone living alone who was 65 years of age or older. The average household size was 2.13 and the average family size was 2.77.

In the city the population was spread out, with 20.0% under 18, 7.8% from 18 to 24, 25.4% from 25 to 44, 21.9% from 45 to 64, and 24.8% ages 65 or older. The median age was 43 years. For every 100 females, there were 79.5 males. For every 100 females age 18 and over, there were 75.0 males.

The median income for a household in the city was $25,371, and the median income for a family was $33,979. Males had a median income of $27,630 versus $17,561 for females. The per capita income for the city was $15,967. About 12.5% of families and 17.2% of the population were below the poverty line, including 21.8% of those under age 18 and 16.7% of those age 65 or over.

Transportation 
Metropolis is served by Interstate 24, which runs from Chattanooga, Tennessee, northwest to Williamson County, Illinois, where it connects with Interstate 57. U.S. Route 45 passes through the center of Metropolis as East 5th Street, Ferry Street, and West 10th Street. US 45 runs geographically east–west through the area but runs north to Chicago and south to Paducah and is signed north–south.

Illinois Route 145 lies east of the city and serves remote areas of nearby Shawnee National Forest.

Metropolis is served by the Paducah & Illinois Railroad, jointly owned by Canadian National Railway, BNSF Railway, and the Paducah & Louisville Railway, crossing the Ohio River on the Metropolis Bridge.

Healthcare 
Metropolis is home to Massac Memorial Hospital, a 25-bed critical access hospital that opened in 1956. Originally shaped like a cross, the hospital is located on the northwest side of town. The hospital has undergone several renovations and additions to make updates to the original facility. Current services offered include ambulance, cardiac rehabilitation, cardiopulmonary, emergency department, imaging, laboratory, Massac Memorial Medical Clinic, rehabilitation services, sleep disorders center, specialty clinic, surgery, and transitional care.  A Fresenius Medical Care dialysis center was constructed on the campus and opened in 2009.

Superman's "hometown"

In his various portrayals, Superman resides in a fictional American city named Metropolis, and on June 9, 1972, the Illinois State Legislature passed Resolution 572, declaring Metropolis, IL, the "Hometown of Superman".

The city has a  painted bronze statue of Superman which sits in front of the county courthouse, and a statue of Noel Neill's Lois Lane from The Adventures of Superman stands just a few blocks away.

Each year on the second weekend of June, Superman fans from all over the world gather in Metropolis for their annual Superman Celebration, which features celebrity guests from movies, television, and the comic book industry.

The four-day annual celebration also boasts vendors selling food, comics, homemade crafts, and other merchandise, as well as discussion panels, auctions, a costume contest, and a variety of other events throughout the weekend. The first such celebration was organized by local civic clubs and took place in June 1979.

The local newspaper is named The Metropolis Planet, inspired by The Daily Planet, the fictional paper in the Superman comics and other Superman media.

The real town of Metropolis is portrayed in one Superman comic-book story, "Superman #92", in a story titled "Massacre in Metropolis!" (which is continued into "Adventures of Superman #515"), as a town whose citizens idolize what is to them the real-life Man of Steel. A villain named Massacre arrives in the town, having gotten lost and thinking he was in the "other" Metropolis, the large city where Superman actually lives. He attacks a security guard and threatens many citizens in order to get proper directions to Superman's Metropolis.

In popular culture

 The 2005 album Illinois from indie musician Sufjan Stevens features a track entitled "The Man of Metropolis Steals Our Hearts".
 In Harry Turtledove's alternate history novel series Southern Victory, the second volume American Front has Metropolis as the scene of a Civil War battle between Union and Confederate forces in 1914.

Notable people 

 Dale Anderson, Maryland politician; born in Metropolis.* Buddy Hall, member of pocket billiards Hall of Fame; born in Metropolis.
 Christopher Jackson, actor and musician, known for playing George Washington in the original Broadway cast of Hamilton; born in Metropolis
 Curt Jones, creator in 1987 of Dippin' Dots ice cream
 Annie Turnbo Malone, businesswoman and philanthropist, founder of the black beauty culture and Poro College
 Moxie Manuel, pitcher for the Washington Senators and Chicago White Sox
 Oscar Micheaux, pioneering African-American filmmaker and author
 John Riegger, Champions Tour golfer
 Jack Smith, driver with NASCAR
 John Steele, WWII paratrooper made famous in the movie The Longest Day (1962)
 Robert Franklin Stroud, convicted murderer known as the Birdman of Alcatraz; buried in Metropolis
 Ben Taylor, first baseman for the St. Louis Browns, Detroit Tigers, and Milwaukee Braves; born in Metropolis
 Hawk Taylor, catcher for the Milwaukee Braves, New York Mets, California Angels, and Kansas City Royals; born in Metropolis
 Betty, Jean and Joanne Weaver, sisters who played in the All-American Girls Professional Baseball League in the early 1950s
 Patrick Windhorst, Illinois state representative and attorney

See also
 List of cities and towns along the Ohio River
 Harrah's Metropolis

References

External links

 
 Story that was broadcast on National Public Radio's "Morning Edition" profiling the town's links to "Superman"

1757 establishments in the French colonial empire
Cities in Illinois
Cities in Massac County, Illinois
County seats in Illinois
Illinois populated places on the Ohio River
Populated places established in 1757
Superman